Eucommia  is a genus of small trees now native to China, with a fossil record that shows a much wider distribution.  The single living species, Eucommia ulmoides, is near threatened in the wild, but is widely cultivated in China for its bark, and is highly valued in herbology such as traditional Chinese medicine.

Description
Modern Eucommia trees grow to about 15 m tall. If a leaf is torn across, strands of latex exude from the leaf veins and solidify into rubber and hold the two parts of the leaf together. It flowers from March to May with the flowers being inconspicuous, small, and greenish. The fruits ripen between June and November and are a winged samara with one seed, very similar to an elm samara in appearance.

Eucommia is dioecious, with separate male and female plants.

Taxonomy
Eucommia is the sole member of the family Eucommiaceae, and was formerly considered to be a separate order, the Eucommiales. The modern species is sometimes known as the "hard rubber tree", "Gutta-percha tree" or "Chinese rubber tree", but is not related to either the true Gutta-percha tree of southeastern Asia, nor to the South American rubber tree.

Eucommia
†Eucommia constans (Miocene-Pliocene; Mexico)
†Eucommia eocenica (Middle Eocene; Mississippi Embayment)
†Eucommia europaea (Oligocene; Europe)
†Eucommia jeffersonensis (latest Eocene; Oregon)
†Eucommia montana  (Early-Late Eocene; western North America)
†Eucommia rolandii (Early-Middle Eocene; Mississippi and British Columbia)
Eucommia ulmoides (Living, central-eastern China)

Distribution
E. ulmoides is native to forest areas on hills and mountains of the provinces in central and eastern China, though it has been suggested that the species is extinct in the wild.  E. ulmoides is also occasionally planted in botanical gardens and other gardens in Europe, North America, and elsewhere, being of interest as the only cold-tolerant (to at least -30 °C) rubber-producing tree. Fossil species of Eucommia have been found in 10- to 35-million-year-old brown coal deposits in central Europe, in numerous fossil sites in Asia, and five different fossil species have been described from North America, indicating the genus had a much wider range in the past.

References

External links

Garryales
Asterid genera
Trees of China
Near threatened plants
Taxa named by Daniel Oliver